Waif and stray was a legal privilege commonly granted by the Crown to landowners under Anglo-Norman law. It usually appeared as part of a standard formula in charters granting privileges to estate-holders, along the lines of "with sac and soc, toll and team, infangthief and outfangthief" and so on.

A waif was an item of ownerless and unclaimed property found on a landowner's territory, while a stray referred to a domestic animal that had wandered onto the same land. Both terms originated from Anglo-Norman French. A grant of waif and stray permitted the landowner to take ownership of such goods or animals if they remained unclaimed after a set period of time. 

In later centuries, the expression "waifs and strays" came to be used as metaphors for – and ultimately became synonymous with – abandoned or neglected children.

See also

 Estray

References

English legal terminology
Medieval law